Rescapé Islands is a small group of rocky islands lying  northwest of Cape Margerie along the Adélie Coast. Surveyed by the French Antarctic Expedition (1949–51) under Andre Liotard, and named in remembrance of an incident of the disembarkation at nearby Port Martin station, when a ship's boat was carried away by the wind.

See also 
 List of Antarctic and sub-Antarctic islands

References

Islands of Adélie Land